The FIBA Asia Under-18 Championship 2004 is the 2004 edition of the FIBA Asia's youth championship for basketball. The games were held at Bangalore, India from 14–23 September 2004.

Draw

Preliminary round

Group A

Group B

Group C

Group D

Quarterfinal round

Group I

Group II

Group III

Group IV

Classification 9th–16th

15th place

13th place

11th place

9th place

Classification 5th–8th

Semifinals

7th place

5th place

Final round

Semifinals

3rd place

Final

Final standing

Awards

References

External links
 Fiba Asia

FIBA Asia Under-18 Championship
2004–05 in Asian basketball
2004 in Indian sport
International basketball competitions hosted by India
September 2004 sports events in Asia